Barbarin may refer to:

 Barbarin, Navarre, a town in Navarre, Spain
 the Tunisian Barbarin, a Tunisian breed of fat-tailed sheep
 The natural plant constituent 5-phenyl-1,3-oxazolidine-2-thione, a breakdown product of a glucosinolate and named from its first isolation from the plant Barbarea vulgaris R. Br.

See also: 
 Barbarin (surname)